Stapfiella claoxyloides is a shrub native to Burundi, Rwana, Uganda, and the Democratic Republic of the Congo, Africa. It's found in wooded grasslands and rainforests at altitudes of 1200 - 2350 m.  

It grows from 1.5-2.5 meter tall, has 1.5-3 cm long leaves, and white flowers. Medicinally, it's used as a treatment for earaches. 

It is currently classified as near threatened.

References 

Flora of Rwanda
Flora of Burundi
Flora of Uganda
Flora of the Democratic Republic of the Congo
Plants described in 1913
Passifloraceae